The 2012 Washington State Cougars football team represented Washington State University during the 2012 NCAA Division I FBS football season. The team was coached by first-year head coach Mike Leach and played their home games at Martin Stadium in Pullman, Washington. They were members of the North Division of the Pac-12 Conference. They finished the season 3–9, 1–8 in Pac-12 play to finish in last place in the North Division.

Schedule

Game summaries

BYU

On a nationally televised broadcast, Mike Leach's first game as head coach of the Washington State Cougars was a 30-6 blowout loss to BYU, the former Texas Tech coach's alma mater. Despite Leach's offenses being typically known for their high scoring shootouts, the Wazzu Cougars were unable to score a single touchdown. This marked the first time that a Leach-led offense failed to score a touchdown since 2006, when Texas Tech lost to TCU 12-3. Wazzu quarterback Jeff Tuel threw for 228 yards and two interceptions, while the offense ran for -4 yards on the ground. The only points for the Washington State Cougars came from two field goals in the second quarter. BYU now leads the series 3–1.

Eastern Washington
Of Note: Andrew Furney made a 60 yard field goal at the end of the first half, which would ultimately prove the difference.

UNLV

Colorado

Oregon

Oregon State

1st quarter scoring: ORST - Trevor Romaine 30-yard field goal.

2nd quarter scoring:	WSU - Andrew Furney 24-yard field goal; ORST - Trevor Romaine 24-yard field goal GOOD.

3rd quarter scoring:

4th quarter scoring:

California

Stanford

Utah

UCLA

The Bruins lead the series 18-39-1, which was started in 1928.

Hours before the game, the Cougars' star receiver Marquess Wilson said in a press release that he has left the program because of the actions of first-year coach Mike Leach and his staff. Wilson was suspended earlier in the week for an unspecified violation of team rules. Wilson said the new staff has "preferred to belittle, intimidate and humiliate us." That included physical abuse, Wilson said.

1st quarter scoring: UCLA – Sheldon Price 68-yard blocked field goal return (Ka'imi Fairbairn kick); Dominique Williams 6-yard pass from Connor Halliday (Andrew Furney kick)

2nd quarter scoring: UCLA - Johnathan Franklin 16-yard pass from Brett Hundley (Fairbairn kick); UCLA – Joseph Fauria 9-yard pass from Hundley (Fairbairn kick); UCLA – Anthony Barr safety; UCLA – Devin Fuller 10-yard pass from Hundley (Fairbairn kick); UCLA – Eric Kendricks 40-yard fumble recovery (Fairbairn kick)
 
3rd quarter scoring: WSU - Brett Bartolone 7-yard pass from Halliday (Furney kick); UCLA – Jordon James 2-yard run (Fairbairn kick); WSU - Marcus Mason 4-yard pass from Halliday (Furney kick)
 
4th quarter scoring: WSU - Dominique Williams 11-yard pass from Halliday (Furney kick); WSU - Kristoff Williams 3-yard pass from Halliday (Dominique Williams pass from Halliday 2-point conversion)

Arizona State

Washington

    
    
    
    
    
    
    
    
    
    

Washington State's first win in the rivalry since 2008.

Roster and coaching staff

References

Washington State
Washington State Cougars football seasons
Washington State Cougars football